Halina Jolanta Nowak-Guńka (born 1 June 1970) is a Polish biathlete and cross-country skier. She competed in the biathlon at the 1998 Winter Olympics and the cross-country skiing at the 1992 Winter Olympics and the 1994 Winter Olympics.

Cross-country skiing results
All results are sourced from the International Ski Federation (FIS).

Olympic Games

World Championships

World Cup

Season standings

References

External links
 

1970 births
Living people
Biathletes at the 1998 Winter Olympics
Cross-country skiers at the 1992 Winter Olympics
Cross-country skiers at the 1994 Winter Olympics
Polish female biathletes
Polish female cross-country skiers
Olympic biathletes of Poland
Olympic cross-country skiers of Poland
People from Rabka-Zdrój